This is a list of ceremonial counties in England by population in 2021/2022.

YReferences

Lists of counties of England
Ceremonial counties of England